Constantina Kouzali (born 2 December 1995) is a Cypriot footballer who plays as a goalkeeper for Cypriot First Division club AC Omonia and the Cyprus women's national team.

Club career
Kouzali has played for Omonia in Cyprus.

International career
Kouzali capped for Cyprus at senior level during the 2023 FIFA Women's World Cup qualification.

References

External links

1995 births
Living people
Cypriot women's footballers
Women's association football goalkeepers
AC Omonia players
Cyprus women's international footballers